Bubares (died after 480 BC) was a Persian nobleman and engineer in the service of the Achaemenid Empire of the 5th century BC. He was one of the sons of Megabazus, and a second-degree cousin of Xerxes I.

Marriage to the sister of Alexander I of Macedon
Bubares was sent to Macedonia in order to settle a diplomatic conflict with King Alexander I. Alexander had been held responsible (as crown prince) for the murder of several members of a Persian delegation a few years earlier. The Persians had taken liberties with the Macedonian women of the Palace, and therefore had all been killed with their assistants by the king Alexander and his men. General Bubares was sent with a contingent of troops to investigate the matter. Alexander resolved the situation by surrendering a large sum of money and marrying his sister Gygaia to Bubares:

The couple had a son Amyntas named after their maternal grandfather. Amyntas later officiated in Caria as a tyrant of the city of Alabanda. After staying a few years in Macedonia, possibly guarding the Axios valley, Bubares left circa 499-498 BC, possibly to attend to the matters of the Ionian revolt. Amyntas I of Macedon is said to have died soon after his departure.

Xerxes canal
From around  483 BC, Xerxes I commissioned Bubares together with Artachaies to lead the construction of what is now known as the Xerxes Canal through the isthmus of the eastern foothills of the Chalkidike peninsula (near Ierissos). There, almost ten years before, the great Persian fleet of Mardonius had been shattered amidst the uneven waves off Mount Athos. The canal avoided the possibility of a repetition of this disaster. The construction of the canal was one of the most elaborate projects of antiquity and lasted three years, as workers were forcibly recruited from various peoples including the inhabitants of Athos.

Strymon bridge

According to Herodotus "the same men who were charged with the digging were also charged to join the banks of the river Strymon by a bridge." The bridge on the Strymon river would also facilitate the progression of the Achaemenid invasion force.

Sources
 Herodotus, History 5, 18–20; 7, 22; 8, 136
 Marcus Iunianus Iustinus 7, 3–4

References

5th-century BC Iranian people
Achaemenid Macedon
Officials of Darius the Great
Xerxes I